Zadorozhny is a rural locality (a settlement) in Krasnoyaruzhsky District, Belgorod Oblast, Russia. The population was 120 as of 2010. There is 1 street.

Geography 
Zadorozhny is located 16 km southwest of Krasnaya Yaruga (the district's administrative centre) by road. Ilek-Penkovka is the nearest rural locality.

References 

Rural localities in Krasnoyaruzhsky District